The SS Abbotsford was a brig-rigged iron passenger ship built by the Gourlay Brothers of Dundee for the Red Star Line, of Antwerp. Despite the company's home in Belgium, the liner was registered in Liverpool and flew the British flag.

She was launched on 29 March 1873. Her maiden voyage from Liverpool to Philadelphia started on 10 May 1873 for the Red Star.

Repairs were made in London, England. That same year, small pox broke out on the ship forcing the hospitalization of 8 passengers with the other passengers sent to Liverpool.

A slight collision occurred in towing.

On 21 July 1875, the Abbotsford was driven ashore in Cummons Bay, Anglesey. Passengers were landed within 30 minutes and lodged at Amlwch. She was on a voyage from Philadelphia to Liverpool. On 23 July the Abbotsford heeled over and sank.

References

Norway Heritage

Ships built in Dundee
1873 ships
Passenger ships
Maritime incidents in November 1874
Maritime incidents in July 1875